Haunting Melissa is a 2013 mobile application, developed by Neal Edelstein, written by Andrew Klavan, and published by Hooked Digital Media, Released May 16, 2013, is a downloadable episodic series that used Dynamic Story Elements (DSE) to change scene elements with additional viewings. Once available on the IOS app store, Haunting Melissa has disappeared from the exchange, can no longer be updated and its website is no longer available leaving fans caught mid story with no resolution.

Plot 
Melissa mysteriously disappears when she seeks out the truth behind her mother's death in an isolated farmhouse.

Cast
Stefanie Bartlett as Goth Girl
Jasmine Berg as Holly
Don Bland as Investigator
Tom Carey as Deputy Roy
Lorette Clow as Dr. Carroway
Alix Dale as Sally
Verner Habraken as ATM Man
Christian Kerr as Carter
Greg Lawson as Jack Strogue
Barb Mitchell as Katherine Strogue
Lisa Moreau as Amanda Maynard
Travis Nelson as Brandon
Larry Reese as Mike Cole
Kassia Warshawski as Melissa Strogue
Lisa Webber 
Eugene Malmberg as Hardware Store Man
Josie Malmberg as Hardware Store Girl
Randy Laycraft as Pipewrench Man
Nicole Zylstra as Attendant

Filming locations 
The series was filmed in Calgary, Alberta.

References

External links 
Haunting Melissa on the Internet Movie Database
Haunting Melissa Official Website
Haunting Melissa on the App Store on iTunes.

IOS software